The Tajikistan men's national tennis team represents Tajikistan in Davis Cup tennis competition and are governed by the National Tennis Federation of the Republic of Tajikistan.

Tajikistan currently compete in the Asia/Oceania Zone of Group IV.

They reached Group II in 2003, but lost all its ties at that level.

History
Tajikistan competed in its first Davis Cup in 1997.  Tajik players previously represented the Soviet Union.

Current team (2022) 

TBD

Tournaments

Statistics
Since 1997(Last updated 26 September 2016)

Tajikistan w/o ... in YYYY.
... w/o Tajikistan in YYYY.

Record
Champion: none
Runner-up: none
Lost in Semifinals: none
Lost in Quarterfinals: none
Lost in First Round: n times

Home and away record (all NN match-ups)
Performance at home (NN match-ups): NN–NN (NN.N%)
Performance away (NN match-ups): NN–NN (NN.N%)
Total: NN–NN (NN.N%)

Head-to-head record (1997–)

 1-0
 2-1
 0-3
 0-4
 0-1
 3-1

 0-3
 3-3
 1-0
 0-1
 2-2
 1-0

 0-1
 2-0
 0-1
 4-2
 2-1
 4-0

 0-2
 1-3
 2-0
 3-1 
 1-1

See also
Davis Cup
Tajikistan Fed Cup team

References

External links

Davis Cup teams
Davis Cup
Davis Cup